The Shire of Ripon was a local government area about  west-northwest of Melbourne, the state capital of Victoria, Australia.

History

Ripon was incorporated as a road district on 12 April 1861, and became a shire on 18 December 1863.

On 23 September 1994, the Shire of Ripon was abolished, and along with the Shire of Lexton and parts of the Shire of Avoca, was merged into the newly created Shire of Pyrenees.

Wards

Ripon was divided into three ridings, each of which elected three councillors:
 Northwest Riding
 East Riding
 Central Riding

Towns and localities
 Beaufort*
 Brewster
 Camp Hill
 Chute
 Middle Creek
 Mount Emu
 Raglan
 Snake Valley
 Stockyard Hill
 Trawalla
 Waterloo

* Council seat.

Population

* Estimate in the 1958 Victorian Year Book.

References

External links
 Victorian Places - Ripon Shire

Ripon
1861 establishments in Australia